Father Came Too! is a 1964 British comedy film directed by Peter Graham Scott and starring James Robertson Justice, Leslie Phillips and Stanley Baxter. It is a loose sequel to The Fast Lady.

It was produced by the Independent Artists company for distribution by Rank. It was shot at Beaconsfield Studios with sets designed by the art director Harry Pottle. The village of Turville in Buckinghamshire was used for filming the pageant scenes. The film's dresses were designed by Julie Harris.

Plot
Dexter (Stanley Baxter) and Juliet (Sally Smith) Munro are a young newly married couple who move to a run-down country cottage in hopes of escaping from Juliet's overbearing father, Sir Beverly Grant (James Robertson Justice). However, the couple is soon confronted by their new home's battered structure.  Juliet's father offers help from a reputable building firm, but this help is refused by Dexter, who wants to remain independent of Juliet's father.
  
Dexter sees an ad in the local paper and employs Josh (Ronnie Barker) to do the work.  The house is finished, although well over budget, but eventually burns down because Juliet's father had changed the fuses from 15 amp to 30 amp, causing the fire.  Roddy, their estate agent (and aspiring actor) (Leslie Phillips) saves the day, telling Dexter and Juliet that a motorway is soon to be built on their land, so they can sell at a profit, and gives them the keys to a cottage requiring no work in the adjoining field.

Cast
 James Robertson Justice as Sir Beverly Grant
 Leslie Phillips as Roddy Chipfield
 Stanley Baxter as Dexter Munro
 Sally Smith as Juliet Munro
 Eric Barker as Mr. Gallagher
 Kenneth Cope as Ron
 Terry Scott as Executioner
 Hugh Lloyd as Mary, Queen of Scots
 Fred Emney as Sir Francis Drake
 Peter Jones as Charles II
 Ronnie Barker as Josh
 Philip Locke as Stan
 Timothy Bateson as Wally
 Cardew Robinson as Fire Officer
 Peter Woodthorpe as Farmer
 James Villiers as Benzil Bulstrode
 John Bluthal as Robert the Bruce
 Joseph Brady as Guy Fawkes
 Raymond Huntley as Mr. Wedgewood
 Vanda Hudson as Nell Gwynne
 Patrick Newell as King Harold
 Geoffrey Dunn as Mr. Trumper
 Sydney Bromley as Lang
 Julian Orchard as Bath Salesman
 Clifford Earl as Motorcycle Policeman
 Nicky Henson as Motorcyclist
 Barbara Roscoe as Lana
 Anita Sharp-Bolster as Mrs. Trumper
 Arthur Mullard as Traffic Warden
 Michael Ward as Man at Auction

Critical reception
TV Guide noted "A broad British comedy."

Kinematograph Weekly called the film a "money maker" at the British box office for 1964.

References

External links
 
 

British sequel films
1964 films
1964 comedy films
British comedy films
Cultural depictions of Charles II of England
Cultural depictions of Francis Drake
Cultural depictions of Guy Fawkes
Cultural depictions of Mary, Queen of Scots
Films shot in Buckinghamshire
1960s English-language films
1960s British films